{{DISPLAYTITLE:Indium (111In) biciromab}}

Indium (111In) biciromab (INN, trade name FibriScint, developed by Centocor) was a drug targeting fibrin, a protein involved in the clotting of blood. It was the Fab' fragment of a mouse monoclonal antibody labelled with the radioisotope indium-111 for the diagnosis of thromboembolism, but was withdrawn during clinical trials.

References 

Biciromab